Lily Thapa is social worker, lecturer, writer and founder of Women for Human Rights which brings Nepalese widows together.

Early life and education
Lily Thapa was born on in Kathmandu, Nepal. A daughter of the Army chief, Lily showed high aptitude and academic promise from very young age, passing her high school at just the age of 14, from Padma Kanya College, Nepal. She also went on to attain a bachelor's degree in (Major: psychology and home science) from the same institute at 17 years of age. Following a gap of some years after this, Lily secured a master's degree in Sociology and Anthropology, from Tribhuwan University, Nepal. She spent subsequent years in Sweden where she completed another Post Graduation in Women-in-management from the Luleo University, Sweden. In 2012, Lily returned to her alma mater seeking her PhD in the subject: Sociological Aspects on Impacts of conflict in Nepal, one that she is currently pursuing.

The story of Lily Thapa
Lily was only 29 years old when her husband, an Army doctor died in the Gulf War in 1994, leaving her in a state of sadness, wrought on due to the loss of her husband, as well as because of her ‘new status’ as a widow. Overnight, Lily went from being an educated and accomplished woman running a Primary School, to having almost no status or sense of personal identity, as dictated by Nepalese society. It was during this period that Lily first came into contact with the grim reality of widowhood in Nepalese society, as well as the reprehensible treatment and practices forced upon women, making them virtually disappear. That was when lily Thapa resolved to become what she is today, a selfless and dedicated woman who inspires those around her with the extraordinary strength and confidence that she carries. Today Lily, at the helm of WHR (Women for Human Rights), has given a new horizon of hope to over 500,000 women, constantly working to uplift and empower them and inspire many more like them.

Career
As indicated by her academic incline and qualifications, Lily specialises in the fields of social work, teaching, counselling and other like activities. She is the founded the RoseBud School in 1990, where she stayed on as Principal, until she sold it in 1996, so as to focus all of her energy and attention on her women's rights organisation/NGO.

The WHR story
One day a Jesuit priest from Lily's children's boarding school approached her, asking her help in speaking with another young woman who was suffering from the throes of widowhood, in an effort to help her find solace. And so Lily, herself being 45-days widowed, went to the home of the mother-in-law of the young woman. The young woman, Laxmi, told Lily a horrific tale of an unhappy marriage, and sexual abuse at the hands of her brother-in-law, moving Lily a great deal and spurring her into resolute action. Thus began in 1992, a 2-year long stint of monthly informal discussion-based sharing sessions/meetings for widows (single women), presided over by Lily as well as occasional talks from experts. These sessions proved quite fruitful as they provided an opportunity for widows (single women) to share their problems and stories with one another, thus helping them achieve relief through the solace of togetherness. Then 2 years later in 1994, WHR (Women for Human Rights) was registered as a formal organisation, with lily at the helm as Founder and Chairperson. Today, over 20 years later, Lily has grown WHR into one of Nepal's largest NGO's, encompassing almost the entire length and breadth of the nation, with over 1500 VDC's (Village Development Committees) and a total of over 100,000 single women under its wing.

Current Affiliations
Over the years Lily has built up and garnered professional affiliations with various organisations that are involved in social works, teaching, counselling, rehabilitation and other such fields. She is currently involved with her old intermediate high school, Padma Kanya College, as a lecturer/visiting faculty. She is the President of the Sankalp foundation that is involved in the co-ordination of a large network of women organisations, with the aim of implementing the National Action Plan on UNSCR1325 and 1820. Lily is also the General-Secretary of SANWED (South Asian Network of Widows’ Empowerment and Development), an organisation that attempts to mainstream the issues of South Asian women into major policy, through extensive lobbying. She also serves as an Advisor for the Nispakchya foundation, which is a network of conflict affected women (CAW). Liliy is a key member of the think tank of the Ministry of Women, Children and Social Welfare, of the Govt of Nepal.

Published works
Over the years Lily Thapa has developed and published various pieces of literature on gender security, women's rights and empowerment, as well as multiple training manuals. Here are some of her most notable publications:

Published book on Role of Women for Peace-building in Nepal–2008
Published book on An Understanding on Gender–2008
Published handbook on Transitional Justice in Nepal-2010
Published book on Status of Single Women in Nepal–2010
Published Handbook on Women, Peace and Security-2011
Developed training manual and handbook on UNSCR1325 for the security forces-2014
Developed curriculum on women, peace and security for class 9 and 10- 2017

Awards
Throughout her career as a social worker and educator, Lily Thapa has received various awards and accolades recognizing her dedicated service to the cause of gender equality in Nepal, and toward the community as a whole:

Prabal Gorkha Award-by the President of Nepal- 2013: for her contribution towards women empowerment
Best Social Entrepreneur Award-by the Ministry of Women, Children and Social Welfare-2008
Woman Manager of the Year (2007)-by Management Association of Nepal (MAN)
Ashoka Fellow Award-by Ashoka International USA-2003
Synergos Fellowship-2012
Social Worker of the Year-2008

References

Nepalese activists
Nepalese women activists
Living people
Year of birth missing (living people)
Ashoka Fellows